is a Japanese actress. She is represented with Office Some One Self.

Biography
Maru graduated from the Tokyo Actors Studio. In the late 1990s, she was a reporter that appeared in news programmes etc. Maru rolled out to become an actress with the hair nude photo collection that was announced in 2001, he has appeared numerously to direct-to-videos and films after that and she has been playing leading acts.

Filmography

Films

Direct-to-video

Advertisements

VP

Bibliography

Photo albums

Gravure

References

Japanese actresses
Japanese female adult models
Actors from Chiba Prefecture
1976 births
Living people